Nikita is an American television drama for The CW that premiered on September 9, 2010. It is based on the 1990 French film La Femme Nikita, 1993 remake Point of No Return, and the 1997 television series La Femme Nikita. The story centers on a secret organization known as Division. Targeting troubled young people from a troubled background, Division erases all evidence of their past lives and molds them into efficient spies and assassins. Nikita is the first recruit to escape and promises to bring down her former employers. Having trained Nikita, Michael, a Division operative, is ordered by his boss Percy to deal with his former student. In the meantime, Division continues training its recruits, Thom, Jaden, and the newest, Alex.

The network picked up the series on May 18, 2010 and it began airing during the 2010–11 television season. On October 22, 2010, The CW gave Nikita a full season pickup of 22 episodes. On May 17, 2011, The CW renewed Nikita for a second season. On August 3, 2011, The CW ordered an additional episode for the second season, which totalled 23 episodes. On May 11, 2012, The CW renewed the series for a third season. On May 9, 2013, The CW renewed the series for a fourth and final season consisting of six episodes.

A total of 73 episodes of Nikita were broadcast over four seasons, between September 9, 2010, and December 27, 2013.

Series overview

Episodes

Season 1 (2010–11)

Season 2 (2011–12)

Season 3 (2012–13)

Season 4 (2013)

Ratings

References

External links 
 
 
 List of Nikita episodes at MSN TV

Lists of American action television series episodes
Lists of American espionage television series episodes
List Of Nikita Episodes